Demilich may refer to:

A type of lich, a creature in fantasy fiction
Demilich (band), a Finnish death metal band
Demilich (Dungeons & Dragons), a type of lich found in the Dungeons & Dragons fantasy role-playing game

See also

 Lich (disambiguation)
 Demi (disambiguation)